Golf at the 2015 Pacific Games was held at the Royal Port Moresby Golf Club in Papua New Guinea on 15–18 July 2015. Hosts Papua New Guinea took a clean sweep of the gold medals in both the men's and women's competitions, with New Caledonia, Cook Islands and Fiji claiming the minor medal positions.

Medal summary

Medal table

Men's results

Women's results

See also
 Golf at the Pacific Games

References

Golf at the Pacific Games
2015 Pacific Games
2015 Pacific Games
Pacific Games